Danguz-e Olya (also Romanized as Dangūz-e ‘Olyā; also known as Vangūz-e ‘Olyā) is a village in Akhtachi Rural District, in the Central District of Bukan County, West Azerbaijan Province, Iran. At the 2006 census, its population was 136, in 24 families.

References 

Populated places in Bukan County